Mizoram is a region in India. Its folk music consists of vocals (singing) accompanied by traditional drums, gong and other native percussion instruments. There is also a long history of flute-playing which is now defunct. The drums are made from a hollow tree trunk with membrane made from cow hide and the gongs, made of brass, are very similar to those found in Myanmar.

History
It is difficult to trace the origin and to arrange the chronological sequences of the heritage of Mizo Music. However, some couplets were developed during the settlement of Thantlang in Burma, estimated between 1300-1400 AD. As recorded by B. Lalthangliana, the folk songs developed during this period were dar hla (songs on gong); Bawh hla (War chants), Hlado (Chants of hunting); Nauawih hla (Cradle songs) A greater development of songs can be seen from the settlement of Lentlang in Burma, estimated between late 15th to 17th Century AD.

The Mizos occupied present-day Mizoram from the late 17th century. The pre-colonial period, that is from the 18th to 19th century A.D. was another important era in the history of Mizo folk literature. Prior to the annexation by the British Government, the Mizos occupied the present Mizoram for two centuries. In comparison with the folk songs of Thantlang and Lentlang settlement, the songs of this period are more developed in its number, form and contents. The languages are more polished and the flows also better. Most of the songs of this period are named after the composers.

In precolonial times, the Mizos used the drum, gong and mouth organ made of gourd and bamboo as musical instruments. With adoption of Christianity, musical instruments other than the drum lost their appeal. The first Musical instrument to enter Mizoram was the mouth organ brought in by Mrs Fraser in 1907. Mr Vankhama, a well known composer was influential in popularizing the guitar in Mizoram.

Classification
The Mizos have a  traditional way of classifying their folk songs. A study of their folksongs on the basis of their own  system of classification shows that the Mizos have about one hundred different types of folksongs. But it can broadly be classified into ten categories:

Bawh Hla
Bawh Hla is the song that the warriors would sing after taking the head of a rival clansman.  It talks about how the severed head whose stench reeked throughout the village is a trophy of his conquest, a prize that he won with the help of his "Thangchem" (a machete used for headhunting). The song is a testimony of his triumph. No other warrior except the killer of the enemy may chant Bawh Hla.

Hlado
This is the chant or cry raised by the hunters when a successful hunt has taken place. Chanting Hlado was done on the spot, or on the way home, or just before entering the village, or on the celebration. Anyone who witnessed his success could chant Hlado at any time and place.

Thiam hla and dawi hla (Invocation & incantation)
These two verse forms are chanted by the Priests and the witch while performing ceremonies.

During ancient religious ceremonies, the priest would recite this song as he prepares the sacrificial animals for the rituals. The Creator- Siamtu Bulpui 'Sa' was given a sacrifice of a pig, and the Protector- 'Khua min enkawltu' was given the sacrifice of a Gayal (Mithun). This sacrifice is then prepared as a feast of prestige for the attendees who are known as Chawngnu and Chawngpa (the worthy ones), in order to appease the vankhua mipui (inhabitants of heaven). This song is also an incantation that gives blessing of children, long life, good harvest, victory in battle and hunting, and it gives blessing so that one may be a Chawngnu and Chawngpa, and also so that they may become Zawhzazo (one who has completed all the obligations of the Mizo Pagan faith). 
	In order to solidify the prayer, the song invokes the ancestors, the founder of ancient mizo religion, Hualthana, and also asks for all that has been left out and any mistakes in the prayer to be answered as well.

Dar Hla
These are named after musical instruments. Dar hla means ‘song for gong’. There are several songs named after the instruments, but Dar hla is the most popular and greatest in number. The compositional significance of these songs lies with the use of three Mizo Dar (Gongs), all tuned to different intervals of the major scale- Aw Pui (Do or the I), Aw Lai (Re or the II), and Aw Te (Mi or the III). This 3 note melody is used in Mizo folksongs to narrate stories to the masses and can be heard in many different iterations.

Puipun Hla
These are songs named after merry and festive occasions. These songs are the most popular among the folksongs. People sung together with dancing at the time of merry and festive occasions.

Lengzem Zai
These are love songs. It has no distinctive form but it was named after the theme. This is presently (c. 1950-2012) the most popular type of folk music in the Mizo community.

Songs named after tribes
Some verse forms are named after the particular tribe such as Sailo zai, Saivate zai etc.

Songs named after villages
A few songs are named after the village such as Lumtui zai, Dar lung zai etc.

Songs named after modulation of the voice
A few song are named after modulation of the voice or sound such as Kawrnu zai, Zai nem, Vai zawi zai, Puma zai etc. For example, Kawrnu is a kind of Cicada whose voice is gentle and low. So the tune of new song resembling to the tune of Kawrnu is called Kawrnu zai.

Songs named after individuals
A great number of Mizo folksongs are named after individual. Most of them are named after the original composer of the music as well as the verse tunes. But some of the songs are named after a beautiful women or the hero of the tribe. The first six have their own common name while the last four have no such common name. eg Chawngvungi Hla. Chawngvungi, in Mizo Folklore, was one of the most beautiful girls in the land who was under the spell of Sawngkhara's dawi Zawlaidi (Love Potion), and this song talks about the absurdities of her dowry. Her mother demanded Dar Huai (Gong of the Brave), a prized gong that could ring harmoniously on its own, considered too valuable to be demanded as bride price for Chawngvungi's hand in marriage. She was obliged and subsequently given her demands. Due to the breaking of tradition when the Dar Huai was handed over to Chawngvungi's mother, a series of consequential events occurred which resulted in the death of Chawnvungi.  Subsequently, Chawngvungi's mother and her in-laws sang a song of lamentation which has been immortalized through the 3 note melody Gong song.

Musical Instruments
From time immemorial, the Mizo have been using different musical instruments. Even though we cannot date the origin, the "Mizo of Kabaw Valley during late 10th to 13th century AD had developed their music as nearly as they have done today". The traditional Mizo musical instruments are very simple and crude in comparison to other Indian musical instruments and very out-dated to Modern Musical instruments. They can broadly be divided into three: Beating or Striking instruments; Wind instruments and String instruments.

Striking Instruments
Most of the Mizo musical instruments used at the time of festivals and dances are striking instruments such as different types of Khuang and Dar, Bengbung, Seki, Talhkhuang.

Khuang
Khuang (drum) is a Mizo indigenous instrument which occupies a very significant place in Mizo social and religious life. Khuang is a must on all occasions. It is made of hollow tree, wrapped on both sides with animal skin. The Mizo gives different names according to its size and length. The big sized one is called Khuangpui (Big drum), the middle one is called Khuanglai; and the small sized, Khuangte (little drum). If it is longish, they called it Kawlkhuang. As far as the history of Mizo is concerned it is commonly concluded that the Mizo ancestors started using drum as far back as when they sang and composed song. Lianhmingthanga believes that the Mizo had received drum from Chinese civilisation through cultural diffusion. The process of that cultural diffusion might have passed through the Burmese with whom the Mizo had a close cultural contact which took place from the middle of the 9th century AD until the end of Pagan period at the close of the 13th century AD. Khuang is the only Mizo traditional musical instrument that is popularly used in the 20th and 21st century. In the olden days, Khuang has no role in the religious functions; but today the use of drum is a must in every church service.

Dar (Gong)
Another popular musical instruments are various sizes of brass-gongs viz-Darkhuang, Darbu and Darmang.

Darkhuang
Darkhuang is the biggest type. Darkhuang is very costly and is one of their most valuable possessions. In the olden times, it was sometimes used as a means of exchange; and sometimes the parent of a bride demanded Darkhuang for the price of their daughter. But this song (dar hla) is played with Darbu. Darkhuang is played on all occasions. Darkhuang is also used to announce demised of a person.

Darbu
Darbu is a set of three different sizes of brass-gongs, producing three musical notes. Darbu is usually played by three experts. Some experts played individually by tying the two gongs, one on each sides of his body with rope and hung one gong by his left hand, produce three distinct, rhythmic notes by simultaneous beating. Darbu is meaningfully used on certain occasions like Khuallam and other traditional group dances.

Darmang
Darmang is the smallest type of gong. It has no effect without other gongs or instruments, but it is used in the traditional dances to keep timing. All these gongs appear to be Burmese in origin, and therefore, it is tempting to conclude that Mizo got them from the Burmese while they were living in the Kabaw Valley during 9th to 13th century AD.

Bengbung
Benghung is another Mizo indigenous instrument which has some similarity with xylophone. It is a musical instrument consisting of a series of flat wooden bars, producing three musical notes. Bengbung is usually played by girls in their leisure.

Talhkhuang
The process of making Talhkhuang is almost the same with that of Bengbung but Talhkhuang is much bigger than that of Bengbung. It is made of three wooden pieces which are curved out, the depth of the curves being made vary so that the sound produced when beaten are different in notes. It is played with a wooden hammer. The Mizo would never take Talhkhuang to their houses or anywhere wise except to Lungdawh, the great platform at the entrance of the village. It has played when a chief or the village erected memorial stones.

Seki
Seki is the domesticated mithun's horn. The two hollow horns are beaten to lead or to keep timing for the other musical band like Darbu, etc. It was commonly used at the time of group dances are performed.

Wind Instruments
The Mizo have six varieties of wind instruments such as Rawchhem, Tumphit, Mautawtawrawl, Phenglawng, Buhchangkuang, Hnahtum.

Rawchhem
It is a kind of Scottish "Bagpiper" or Chinese "Snag". Nine small Bamboo pipes or hollow reeds, Having different sizes and lengths are inserted to the dried gourd. One of the pipes serves as a mouth piece. Small portions of the pipes are struck out so that it can produce sound when the instrument is blown. The Musician blows into the mouth piece, and by controlling the holes with his fingers, he can produced various musical notes.

Tumphit
Tumphit is made of three small Bamboos having different sizes and length. The types are tied and plated in a row with caves or strings. The upper ends are cut open at different length so that each tube has different notes. The players put the open tube against his lower lip and then blows down. This musical instrument was used during ritual ceremonies and particularly on the occasion of a ceremony called Rallulam and chawng festival, the use of this music was a must.

Tawtawrawt
This is a Bamboo trumpet. Different sizes of bamboo tubes are cut off. The smaller tube is inserted to the bigger tube and so on. Many bamboo tubes are joined one after another till the last tube happens to be the size of a forefinger from where the trumpet is to be blown. A dry empty gourd, the bottom part is cut off and joined with bigger end of the bamboo tubes. The whole length can be more than five feet.

Phenglawng
It is the Mizo flute made of bamboo. Originally, Phenglawng had only three holes producing three different sounds. Flute is popular among the other Indians.

Buhchangkuang
This is another flute made of reed or a paddy stalk. This simple instrument was usually played by girls.

Hnahtum
The Mizo boys can skillfully turn leaves of many trees into simple but indigenous musical instruments. They can produce interesting sound by blowing deftly folded leaves. This is called Hnahtum.

Stringed Instruments
The Mizo have only three kinds of stringed instruments, namely Ṭingṭang, Lemlawi and Tuiumdar:

Ṭingṭang
This is Mizo guitar. Mizo ṭingṭang is a kind of fiddle or violin having only one string. A piece of bamboo shaft is fixed in the gourd to carry the string made of Thangtung, the fibre of the Malay Sago palm. The hollow gourd is cut open and covered with a dry bladder of animal.

Lemlawi
Lemlawi is the family of jaw harp but the shape and size are different. It is made of small pieces of bamboo. From the piece of bamboo, the craftsman took out a small portion with knife for its string. The sound it produces is controlled by the mouth.

Tuium dar
This simple musical instrument is also made of bamboo having three strings producing three different notes. From the outer covering of the bamboo, three pieces of cane like strings are curved out. The strings are then raised up by inserting two pieces of bamboo. It is played like a guitar.

Artists
The earliest popular Mizo artists include Lallianmawia Pachuau, CFL Hmingthanga, Lalṭanpuia Tochhawng, C. Lalrinmawia, K. Lalchamliana, H. Lalṭhakima, and Liandailova Chhangte.
Popular female artists include Daduhi, Liandingpuii, Catherine Khiangte, Zoramchhani, Spi and Mami Varte in the current generation, and Vanhlupuii, Vanlalruati and C. Luri as more senior artists.
Popular male artists include Booma, Vanlalsailova, Michael M Sailo, Joseph Zaihmingthanga, and F. Zothlamuana (Atea) Cellevain Mama Chawngthu.

Notes

References
Thangliana, B., Mizo Literature.
Lalruanga, A study on Mizo Folk Literature.
Zawla, K., Mizo Pipute leh an Thlahte Chanchin.
Lalthangliana, B., History of Mizo in Burma.
Lianhmingthanga, Material culture of the Mizo, 1998.
Thanmawia, B., Mizo and Music, Mizoram News Magazine, Autumn Issue, 1985, p. 12
McKenzie, Kathryn, Chhinlung Magazine.

External links
 History of Mizoram Music

 
Mizoram
Culture of Mizoram